Schimmelbusch is a surname of German origin. Notable people with the surname include:

 Curt Schimmelbusch (1860–1895), German physician and pathologist
 Daryl Schimmelbusch (born 1954), Australian rules footballer
 Heinz Schimmelbusch (born 1944), Austrian businessman
 Wayne Schimmelbusch (born 1953), Australian rules footballer

See also
 Schimmelbusch mask, anaesthesia device

German-language surnames